NGC 498 is a lenticular galaxy located about 260 million light-years away from Earth, in the constellation Pisces. NGC 498 was discovered by astronomer R. J. Mitchell  on October 23, 1856.

NGC 498 is a member of the NGC 507 Group which is part of the Perseus–Pisces Supercluster.

See also  
 Lenticular galaxy 
 List of NGC objects (1–1000)

References

External links 
 

Lenticular galaxies
Pisces (constellation)
0498
5059
Astronomical objects discovered in 1856
Discoveries by R. J. Mitchell (astronomer)
Perseus-Pisces Supercluster